Willy Raymond Simonsen (1927 – 26 February 2011) was a Norwegian sports official.

He played football for Homansbyens BK during his youth, and after his active career he joined Årvoll IL. Simonsen spent his entire working career in the Football Association of Norway. He started as a delivery boy in 1946. He later held tasks such as judicial adviser and press contact. In the 1980s he was acting secretary-general twice; first after Trygve Bornø quit in 1985 and then after Svein Erik Haagenrud quit in 1988. He served as assisting secretary-general until his retirement in 1997.

In 1996 he was awarded the King's Medal of Merit. He died in February 2011.

References

1927 births
2011 deaths
Sportspeople from Oslo
Norwegian sports executives and administrators
Recipients of the King's Medal of Merit